A high sheriff is a ceremonial officer for each shrieval county of England and Wales and Northern Ireland or the chief sheriff of a number of paid sheriffs in U.S. states who outranks and commands the others in their court-related functions. In Canada, the High Sheriff provides administrative services to the supreme and provincial courts.

The office existed in the Irish Free State, but was abolished in 1926.

In England and Wales, the offices of high sheriff were created at the direction of the Local Government Act 1972 incepting on 1 April 1974. The purpose was to distinguish sheriffs of counties proper from sheriffs of cities and boroughs designated counties corporate. Except for the City of London, which has two sheriffs, these cities and boroughs no longer have sheriffs, leaving only high sheriffs in England and Wales in the sheriff's office. The office is now an unpaid privilege with ceremonial duties, the sheriffs being appointed annually by the Crown through a warrant from the Privy Council except for Cornwall, where the high sheriff is appointed by the Duke of Cornwall and for Merseyside, Greater Manchester and Lancashire, where the High Sheriff is appointed by the Duke of Lancaster (currently the King). In England and Wales the office's civil (civil judgement) enforcement powers exist but are not exercised by convention.

The Website of the High Sheriffs’ Association of England and Wales stated in 2021 that the role was a "non-political Royal appointment", for one year, and unpaid.

England, Wales, and Northern Ireland 

In England, Wales and Northern Ireland the high sheriff (or in the City of London the sheriffs) are theoretically the sovereign's judicial representative in the county, while the lord-lieutenant is the sovereign's personal and military representative.  Their jurisdictions, the shrieval counties, are no longer conterminous with administrative areas, representing a mix between the ancient counties and more recent local authority areas.  The post contrasts with that of sheriff in Scotland, who is a judge sitting in a sheriff court.

The word sheriff is a contraction of the term shire reeve. The term, from the Old English scīrgerefa, designated a royal official responsible for keeping the peace (a reeve) throughout a shire or county on behalf of the king. The term was preserved in England notwithstanding the Norman Conquest. The office of sheriff had its origins in the 10th century; the office reached the height of its power under the Norman kings. While the sheriffs originally had been men of great standing at court, the 13th century saw a process whereby the office devolved on significant men within each county, usually landowners. The Provisions of Oxford (1258) established a yearly tenure of office. The appointments and duties of the sheriffs in England and Wales were redefined by the Sheriffs Act 1887. Under the provisions of the Local Government Act 1972, on 1 April 1974, the office previously known as sheriff was retitled high sheriff.

The serving high sheriff submits a list of names of possible future high sheriffs to a tribunal which chooses three names to put to the sovereign. The nomination is made on 12 November every year and the term of office runs from 25 March, Lady Day, which was the first day of the year until 1751. No person may be appointed twice in three years unless there is no other suitable person in the county.

Nomination 
The Sheriffs Act 1887 (as amended) provides that sheriffs should be nominated on 12 November (Martinmas), or the Monday following if it falls on a Sunday, by any two or more of the Chancellor of the Exchequer, the Lord President of the Council, and the Lord Chief Justice of England; other members of the Privy Council; and any two or more judges of the High Court. These amendments were in 1998, the Chancellor of the Exchequer was granted full entitlement, not merely conditional entitlement, if there is no Lord High Treasurer – since the treasurership is by constitutional convention always placed into commission, and in 2006 the Lord Chancellor was removed as a nominating officer through the operation of the Constitutional Reform Act 2005.

These officers nominate three candidates for each county in England and Wales (with the exception of Cornwall, Merseyside, Greater Manchester and Lancashire), which are enrolled on a parchment by the King's Remembrancer.

Eligibility for nomination and appointment as high sheriff under the Sheriffs Act 1887 excludes peers of Parliament, members of the House of Commons, commissioners or officers of Her Majesty's Revenue and Customs, officers of the Post Office and officers of the Navy, Army or Royal Air Force on full pay, clergymen (whether beneficed or not) and barristers or solicitors in actual practice.

Pricking 
The practice of pricking is an ancient custom used to appoint the high sheriffs of England and Wales.

In February or March of each year, two parchments prepared the previous November are presented to the Sovereign (who is also Duke of Lancaster) at a meeting of the Privy Council. A further parchment is drawn up in November for Cornwall and presented to the Duke of Cornwall (or to the Sovereign when there is no such Duke).

Certain eligible persons (High Court judges and the Privy Council) nominate candidates for each county shrievalty, one of whom is chosen for each by the sovereign. In practice, the first name on the list is nowadays always the one chosen; the second and third names tend to become sheriffs in succeeding years, barring incapacity or death. The Sovereign signifies assent by pricking (i.e., piercing) the document with a silver bodkin by the relevant name for each county, and signs the parchment when complete. The parchment for the Duchy of Lancaster is known as the Lites, and the ceremony of selection known as Pricking the Lites. The term lites, meaning list, was once reserved for Yorkshire; the date at which the name was transferred to Lancashire is unknown.  The Lites is used for the three shrieval counties that fall wholly or partially within the boundaries of the historic county palatine of Lancaster, since 1 April 1974: Lancashire, Greater Manchester, and Merseyside.

The practice is believed to date back to a year in the reign of Elizabeth I, when, lacking a pen, she decided to use her bodkin to mark the name instead. By contrast, Lord Campbell stated, perhaps without the intention of publication, in February 1847, "[it began] in ancient times, sir, when sovereigns did not know how to write their names." while acquiring a prick and a signature from Queen Victoria as Prince Albert asked him when the custom began. The High Sheriffs' Association argues pricking vellum ensured that the record could not be altered. Given that holders of the office often had to bear large costs and implement unpopular policies altering the choice of the monarch must sometimes have been tempting.

Declaration 
The declaration a person must make before taking the office of high sheriff is contained in the second schedule of the Sheriffs Act 1887. Additional words are inserted in the case of the Duchy of Cornwall; for example, the declaration includes: "do solemnly declare that I will well and truly serve the Queen’s Majesty and also his Royal Highness Duke of Cornwall".

Responsibilities 
Contemporary high sheriffs have few genuine responsibilities and their functions are largely representational, which include attendance at royal visits and a High Court judge opening ceremony, proclamation of a new Sovereign, and acting as a returning officer during elections.

Theoretical responsibilities include the well-being and protection of High Court judges, and attending them in court; and the maintenance of the loyalty of subjects to the Crown. However, most of the high sheriff's work is delegated (for example, the local police now protect judges and courts) so that in effect the post of high sheriff is essentially ceremonial.

The high sheriff was traditionally responsible for the maintenance of law and order within the county, although most of these duties are now delegated to the police. As a result of its close links with law and order the position is frequently awarded to people with an association with law enforcement (former police officers, lawyers, magistrates, judges). The high sheriff was originally allowed to kill suspects resisting arrest; this was still legal in the 17th century. Edward Coke noted that when the high sheriff employed constables to assist in his duties the law was also extended to them.

Powers 
Under the provisions of the Sheriffs Act 1887, if a sheriff finds any resistance in the execution of a writ he shall "take with him the power of the county" (known as posse comitatus), and shall go in proper person to do execution, and may arrest the resisters and commit them to prison, and every such resister shall be guilty of a misdemeanor.

Exceptional counties

City of London 
There are two sheriffs of the City of London, elected annually by the City of London liverymen; their function is similar, but not equivalent to that of High Sheriff, since the 1887 Act contains the saving "Nothing in this Act shall affect the privilege of the mayor, commonalty, and citizens of the city of London to elect the sheriffs of London". The sheriffs of London also served as sheriffs for Middlesex until 1889 when the office of High Sheriff of Middlesex was created.

Cornwall 
The Duchy of Cornwall's first charter in 1337 states that the Shrievalty of Cornwall, the right to appoint the sheriff for the county, is vested in the Duke of Cornwall. Two further charters, dated 18 March 1337 and 3 January 1338, state that no sheriff of the king shall enter Cornwall to execute the king's writ. The High Sheriff of Cornwall swears to serve both the reigning monarch and Duke of Cornwall (i.e., the crown prince). When there is no Duke of Cornwall, the Duchy Council still sits, but under the trusteeship of the English (since 1707, British) monarch. Only as Duchy Trustee can the monarch appoint the Sheriff of Cornwall. Nomination and appointment generally takes place during Hilary, and announced via the Duchy of Cornwall Office.

Durham 
The High Sheriff of Durham was appointed by the Prince-Bishop of Durham until 1836, when the jurisdiction of the county palatine became vested in the Crown. Since then the high sheriffs of Durham have been appointed in the same way as other high sheriffs in England and Wales.

Isle of Ely 
After an Act of Parliament in 1535/6 ended the palatine status of the Isle, the bishop remained custos rotulorum and appointed a chief bailiff for life to perform the functions of high sheriff within the liberty.

Lancashire 
The right to nominate and select high sheriffs in Lancashire is vested in the monarch in right of the Duchy of Lancaster. Before 1974, this right applied only to the High Sheriff of Lancashire, but since the administrative changes of the Local Government Act 1972 (effective 1974), the High Sheriff of Greater Manchester and High Sheriff of Merseyside also come under the jurisdiction of the Duchy of Lancaster. As with  other counties in England, three names are nominated to the Chancellor of the Duchy of Lancaster for Lancashire appointments; the chancellor presents these to the monarch with his recommendation in a private audience. New appointments are usually announced during Hilary.

London and Middlesex

Wales 
The nomination of sheriffs in the counties of Wales was first vested by statute in the Council of Wales and the Marches and the Welsh justices under Henry VIII. With the abolition of the Council in 1689, the power of nomination was transferred to the justices of the Court of Great Sessions in Wales. When this court was abolished in 1830, its rights were in turn transferred to the courts of King's Bench, Exchequer, and Commons Pleas. Finally, by an Act of Parliament of 1845, the nomination and appointment of sheriffs in Wales was made identical to that in England.

Ireland 
The Sheriffs (Ireland) Act 1920 restricted the duties of the high sheriff to summoning of the county grand jury and attending the judge at assizes. In the Irish Free State the Courts of Justice Act 1924 abolished the grand jury and the assizes; and the office of high sheriff was formally abolished by the Court Officers Act 1926. The office continues to exist in Northern Ireland.

Canada 
In the Province of Newfoundland and Labrador, the High Sheriff of Newfoundland and Labrador is primarily responsible for providing administrative and enforcement services to the Supreme Court of Newfoundland and the Provincial Courts. The Office of the High Sheriff administers the jury system, provides court security and executes orders and decisions of the court. These Officers act in the name of the Sheriff in accordance with directions given them and the law. They include bailiffs, Deputy Sheriffs, fee-for-service Deputy Sheriffs, and all other employees and staff of the High Sheriff. Sheriff's Officers have both the power and the duty to carry out orders of the Court. They are peace officers under the Criminal Code of Canada and have all the powers and protection of law enforcement officers.

United States 
The position of high sheriff in the United States generally denotes the superior sheriff in a state, or the head of a statewide sheriff's department. Such a position exists in Rhode Island (executive high sheriff), and Hawaii. In New Hampshire, the ten high sheriffs are the senior law enforcement officers of each county, and have police powers throughout the state.

The Cherokee Nation formerly appointed a high sheriff, who was also the warden and treasurer of the Cherokee National Jail in Oklahoma. The position was created in 1876, after the abolition of the Light Horse. The first Cherokee high sheriff was Sam Sixkiller, appointed in 1876.

See also 
Chief constable, currently the head of law enforcement in most of England and Wales
List of shrievalties
List of High Sheriffs of England, Wales and Northern Ireland 2007
List of High Sheriffs of England, Wales and Northern Ireland 2008
List of High Sheriffs of England, Wales and Northern Ireland 2009
List of high sheriffs of England, Wales and Northern Ireland 2010
High Court enforcement officers
Sheriff court (Scotland)
Sheriff (brief details around the world)
Bailiff (one of seven more junior, related offices in England and Wales to be re-branded as enforcement officer for all but water bailiff and jury bailiff in 2014)

References

Sources 
 Morris, W. A. "The Office of Sheriff in the Early Norman Period," English Historical Review (1918) 33#130 pp. 145–175 in JSTOR
Duchy of Lancaster: Palatinate High Sheriffs'', accessed 5 August 2008
The National Archives: Duchy of Lancaster: Records of Appointment of the High Sheriff of the County Palatine of Lancaster, accessed 5 August 2008
Wirral Globe: Former Birkenhead pupil is our new High Sheriff, accessed 5 August 2008
Lancaster Priory: History of the Duchy of Lancaster and the Office of High Sheriff, accessed 5 August 2008

External links 
The High Sheriffs Association of England and Wales.

Sheriffs
.
British monarchy

Local government in the United Kingdom
Law enforcement in the United States
Law enforcement occupations in the United Kingdom
Law enforcement titles
Ceremonial officers in the United Kingdom